The 2009 MBC Drama Awards is a ceremony honoring the outstanding achievement in television on the Munhwa Broadcasting Corporation (MBC) network for the year of 2009. It was held on December 30, 2009 and hosted by actor Lee Hwi-jae and actress Park Ye-jin.

Nominations and winners
(Winners denoted in bold)

References

External links
http://www.imbc.com/broad/tv/ent/event/2009mbc/

MBC Drama Awards
MBC Drama Awards
MBC Drama Awards